Grover is an unincorporated community in Douglas County, Kansas, United States.  It is located 4 miles west of Lecompton and 6 miles east of Tecumseh.

History
Grover had a post office from 1886 to 1895 and again from 1897 to 1899.

References

Further reading

External links
 Douglas County maps: Current, Historic, KDOT

Unincorporated communities in Douglas County, Kansas
Unincorporated communities in Kansas